Earl Gray McCready (June 5 or 15, 1905 – December 9, 1983) was a Canadian amateur and professional wrestler. McCready competed in the U.S. collegiately for Oklahoma State University in folkstyle, and as a freestyle wrestler he competed for Canada in the 1928 Summer Olympics. In 1930, he won a gold medal in the heavyweight class at the British Empire Games. He soon turned pro shortly after and became a three-time NWA British Empire Heavyweight Champion.

McCready was nicknamed 'The Moose' during his wrestling career.

Personal life
McCready was born on June 5th or 15th 1905 in Lansdowne, Ontario. He grew up on a farm in open rural area of Saskatchewan in the north regions with Regina as its capital city, Western Canada.

McCready died on the 9th of December 1983 in Seattle, Washington, United States at the age of 78.

Career

Amateur wrestling

McCready attracted the attention of Oklahoma State wrestling coaches when he defeated their heavyweight at a 1926 tournament in Canada. McCready would then come to Stillwater, Oklahoma, where he played football and wrestled. In three years of wrestling varsity, the 5'11", 238-pound McCready was 25–0, with all but three of his victories by pin. In 1928, McCready finished sixth in the Olympic Freestyle Heavyweight Tournament. 

As an Oklahoma State Cowboy, McCready won three NCAA heavyweight titles (1928–1930), becoming the first three-time NCAA wrestling champion. He was also the first foreign-born NCAA wrestling champion. He is one of only two collegiate wrestlers with three NCAA titles to win all three of his finals matches by pin (the other being Dan Hodge of the University of Oklahoma, 1955–1957). McCready still owns the record of fastest fall in an NCAA final, pinning Ralph Freese of the University of Kansas in just nineteen seconds at the very first NCAA wrestling championships in 1928.

At the 1930 Empire Games, he won the gold medal in the heavyweight class.

Professional wrestling
Following McCready's graduation from Oklahoma A&M with a degree in physical education, he became a pro wrestler in late 1930, pursuing a professional wrestling career. McCready finished sixth in the Olympic Freestyle Heavyweight Tournament and he won a gold medal in Freestyle as a heavyweight at the first British Empire Games in Hamilton, Ontario, Canada in 1933, also in the same year as well, roughly two years after the start of his career, McCready had defeated the ten year reigning British Empire champion Jack Taylor. McCready worked for Stu Hart's Stampede Wrestling during the 50s.

Retirement
In the early 1950s McCready became a star of Stu Hart's fledgling Stampede Wrestling promotion. In 1958 McCready fought his last wrestling match at Maple Leaf Gardens in Toronto, Ontario, Canada. He retired from wrestling after a 28-year career in the sport.

Championships and accomplishments
Canadian Wrestling Hall of Fame
Class of 2000
Dominion Wrestling Union
NWA British Empire/Commonwealth Championship (New Zealand version) (2 times)
George Tragos/Lou Thesz Professional Wrestling Hall of Fame
Class of 2005
National Wrestling Alliance
NWA British Empire Heavyweight Championship (Toronto version) (3 times, first)
NWA Pacific Coast Heavyweight Championship (San Francisco version) (1 time)
Professional Wrestling Hall of Fame
Class of 2016, "Pioneer" category
Stampede Wrestling
Alberta Tag Team Championship (1 time) - with Ski Hi Lee
Stampede Wrestling Hall of Fame (Class of 1995)
Wrestling Observer Newsletter
Wrestling Observer Newsletter Hall of Fame (Class of 1996)
Other titles:
Canadian Heavyweight Championship (2 times)

References

External links
 

1905 births
1983 deaths
Olympic wrestlers of Canada
Wrestlers at the 1928 Summer Olympics
Canadian male sport wrestlers
Wrestlers at the 1930 British Empire Games
Commonwealth Games gold medallists for Canada
Wrestling people from Ontario
Canadian male professional wrestlers
Professional wrestlers from Ontario
Professional Wrestling Hall of Fame and Museum
People from Leeds and Grenville United Counties
Commonwealth Games medallists in wrestling
Gridiron football people from Ontario
Canadian players of American football
Oklahoma State Cowboys football players
Oklahoma State Cowboys wrestlers
Stampede Wrestling alumni
NWA British Empire Heavyweight Champions (Toronto version)
NWA Canadian Heavyweight Champions (Calgary version)
Medallists at the 1930 British Empire Games